The Santa Fe Swamp is 95-percent floodplain  swamp. Along with Lake Santa Fe and Little Lake Santa Fe, it serves as headwaters of the Santa Fe River, which drains into the Suwannee River and then finally the Gulf of Mexico. It is located to the north of those lakes in Bradford County and Alachua County in Florida.

Santa Fe Swamp Wildlife and Environmental Area
The  Santa Fe Swamp Wildlife and Environmental Area (WEA) was donated to the Suwannee River Water Management District in 1984 by Georgia-Pacific Corporation. At that time, it was the largest and most environmentally significant donation in the state of Florida's history.  Allowable uses are wildlife viewing, hunting, bicycling, hiking, and horseback riding on administrative roads.

External links
Santa Fe Swamp Wildlife & Environmental Area - official site

Landforms of Alachua County, Florida
Landforms of Bradford County, Florida
Swamps of Florida
Protected areas of Bradford County, Florida
Floodplains of the United States